Lorea Canales (Mexico City Mexico) is a lawyer, journalist, translator and writer. Her books, Apenas Marta (2011) and Los Perros (2013), have been critically well-received and featured at the International Book Fair in Monterrey, Guadalajara and at the Instituto de Cervantes in New York. An English translation of Apenas Marta (Becoming Marta) was released in the U.S. in early 2016.

Biography
Canales is a lawyer, journalist, translator, and novelist. She was born in Mexico City and raised in Monterrey where she studied law at the Monterrey Institute of Technology and Higher Education. Canales attended Georgetown Law, and worked in the Law Offices of Collier Shannon Rill & Scott in Washington, D.C. In 1997, she returned to Mexico, she worked as a lawyer, taught law at Instituto Tecnológico Autónomo de México (IATM), and joined the newspaper Reforma as a legal correspondent.

In 2000, Canales moved to New York, where she wrote for several newspapers such as Día Siete, Travesías and The New York Times.  She wrote a chapter on Lorenzo Zambrano, CEO Cemex, for the book "Los amos de México, by journalist Jorge Zepeda Patterson, published in 2007. In 2010, Canales received a master's degree in creative writing from New York University. She published her novel Apenas Marta (Becoming Marta)] in 2011, and Los Perros (The Dogs) in 2013. Apenas Marta has been published in English as Becoming Marta by Amazon Crossing, Amazon's Spanish language publishing house.

Critical appraisal
Canales is considered an author of modern global literature. She has been praised for the detail and credibility of her characters. Her novels have been presented at national literary venues such as the International Book Fair in Monterrey, Guadalajara and Instituto de Cervantes in New York.

Bibliography
 (2007) Los amos de México, by Jorge Zepeda Petterson. Lorea Canales is author of the chapter about Lorenzo Zambrano. (Planeta)
 (2011) Apenas Marta, novel (Plaza y Janés )
 (2013) Los Perros, novel (Plaza y Janés )
 (2014) Escribir en Nueva York. Antología de narradores hispanoamericanos, ed. by Claudia Salazar. (Caja Negra)
 (2014) Los Bárbaros 2. Antología de poemas e historias cortas. (Newyopolis )

References 

Writers from Mexico City
20th-century Mexican lawyers
Mexican women journalists
Mexican women novelists
Mexican translators
Mexican women poets
21st-century Mexican writers
21st-century Mexican women writers
Living people
Mexican women lawyers
Year of birth missing (living people)
21st-century translators